The 2001 Australian federal election was held in Australia on 10 November 2001. All 150 seats in the House of Representatives and 40 seats in the 76-member Senate were up for election. The incumbent Liberal Party of Australia led by Prime Minister of Australia John Howard and coalition partner the National Party of Australia led by John Anderson defeated the opposition Australian Labor Party led by Kim Beazley.

Future Opposition Leader Peter Dutton entered parliament at this election.

Background

Throughout much of 2001, the Coalition had been trailing Labor in opinion polls, thanks to dissatisfaction with the government's economic reform programme and high petrol prices. The opposition Australian Labor Party had won a majority of the two-party-preferred vote at the previous election and had won a series of state and territory elections. Labor also recorded positive swings in two by-elections, taking the Queensland seat of Ryan and coming close in Aston.

However following the September 11 attacks, and the Children Overboard and Tampa affairs, Polls swung strongly toward the coalition after the "Tampa" controversy but before the 11 September attacks.

In fact, voter concern with terrorism in the aftermath of the September 11 attacks in the United States was noted, with the rise in the combined primary votes of the major parties
from 79.61% at the previous election in 1998, to 81.17% at this election. There would be further increases in the combined major party primary vote in 2004 and 2007.

Another major issue was the collapse of the country's second-biggest airline Ansett Australia and the question of whether it should be given a bailout. The Coalition was opposed to any bailout because the collapse was not the government's fault. However, Labor supported a bailout, because the company's collapse was about to result in the biggest mass job loss in Australian history, whilst also arguing that the government was partially responsible for allowing Ansett to be taken over by Air New Zealand, a move which had caused Ansett's failure. Although the two-party preferred result was reasonably close, the ALP recorded its lowest primary vote since 1934.

Political scientists have suggested that television coverage has subtly transformed the political system, with a spotlight on leaders rather than parties, thereby making for more of an American presidential-style system. In this election, television news focused on international issues, especially terrorism and asylum seekers.  Minor parties were largely ignored as the two main parties monopolised the media's attention. The election was depicted as a horse-race between Howard and Beazley, with Howard running ahead and therefore being given more coverage than his Labor rival.

The election-eve Newspoll forecast that the Liberal/National Coalition would get 53 percent of the two-party-preferred vote.

Results

House of Representatives results

Senate results

House of Representatives preference flows

 The Nationals had candidates in 14 seats where three-cornered-contests existed, with 87.34% of preferences favouring the Liberal Party.
 The Democrats contested 145 electorates with preferences favouring Labor (64.13%).
 The Greens contested 145 electorates with preferences strongly favouring Labor (74.83%).
 One Nation contested 120 electorates with preferences slightly favouring the Liberal/National Coalition (55.87%).

Seats changing hands

The following table indicates seats that changed hands from one party to another at this election. It compares the election results with the previous margins, taking into account redistributions in New South Wales, Western Australia, South Australia, Tasmania and both territories. As a result, it includes the seats of Macarthur and Parramatta, which were held by Liberal members but had notional Labor margins. The table also includes the new seat of Hasluck (retained by Labor); the abolished Northern Territory, which was divided into Lingiari (retained by Labor) and Solomon (retained by the CLP); and Paterson, a Labor seat made Liberal by the redistribution

See also 
 Candidates of the 2001 Australian federal election
 Members of the Australian House of Representatives, 2001–2004
 Members of the Australian Senate, 2002–2005

Notes

References

External links
Australian Electoral Commission Results
University of WA  election results in Australia since 1890
AEC 2PP vote
AustralianPolitics.com election details
Preference flows – ABC

Federal elections in Australia
2001 elections in Australia
Articles containing video clips
November 2001 events in Australia